The Bronco Student Center is a student activity center for meetings, conferences, meals, recreation, and shopping for students and alumni on the campus of Cal Poly Pomona in Pomona, California. The building houses Cal Poly Pomona Associated Students government offices, as well as other student-run departments.  The original building was built in 1976 and was designed by architecture instructor James Pulliam.

Bronco Art Program
From the ASI Art Program at Cal Poly Pomona website

The mission of the ASI Bronco Student Center Art Program is to create an engaging and stimulating environment by acquiring and displaying exhibits and informative topics by living artists that reflect diversity of art produced; particularly in the Los Angeles metropolitan area. Because artists play a critical role in culture and society, one of the program's goals is to advance the intellectual life of the campus community through art.

Food services

In addition to the Campus Center Marketplace the student center offers a variety of dining options.

 Hibachi San
 Freshens Smoothies
 Peet's Coffee & Tea
 Poly Fresh Market
 Round Table Pizza
 Subway
 Qdoba

Other services
Games Room Etc.
Copy and Mail

References

External links

Student activity centers in the United States
Buildings and structures in Pomona, California